New Way Forward may refer to:
New Way Forward Act, United States immigration reform legislation introduced in 2019
The New Way Forward, a working title for the Iraq War troop surge of 2007

See also
 Way Forward (disambiguation)